The North Fork Smith River is  tributary of the Smith River that begins in the U.S. state of Oregon and ends in the U.S. state of California. Arising near Chetco Peak in the Klamath Mountains, it flows generally south to meet the Middle Fork Smith River at Gasquet, California. The combined streams form the Smith River.

Wild and scenic
The entire  of the river that lie within Oregon are part of the National Wild and Scenic Rivers System. In 1988,  was designated "wild" in two separate segments, from the headwaters to Horse Creek and from Baldface Creek to the Oregon–California border. The  stretch between Horse and Baldface creeks was classified "scenic".

Recreation
Hiking trails near the North Fork include North Fork Trail, which follows a ridge along the southeast edge of the Kalmiopsis Wilderness in the Rogue River – Siskiyou National Forest in Oregon. Suitable for hikers and horseback riders, the  trail passes through the area of the Biscuit Fire.

Connected to the North Fork Trail is the Baldface Trail, which crosses Baldface Creek, a North Fork tributary. The  trail, which also passes through the Biscuit Fire area, is suitable for day hiking but not for horse riding.

The North Fork Trail also connects to the Kalmiopsis Rim Trail, which links to a large network of trails in and near the wilderness and other parts of the national forest.

Sourdough Campground, undeveloped but open to dispersed camping in a meadow along the river, lies near the confluence of the North Fork with Baldface Creek in Oregon. The remote campground, open all year, has five sites for tent or trailer camping, picnic tables, fire rings, a vault toilet, and limited parking, but no drinking water or garbage pickup.

Lightly used by whitewater enthusiasts because it is difficult, remote, and often of insufficient flow for boating, the river is sometimes run for its lower  in rafts or kayaks. This segment, all within California, is rated Class III (intermediate) and IV (advanced) on the International Scale of River Difficulty.

Water quality
The North Fork's water is of outstanding quality, with low turbidity and almost no pollution. Little logging or road building has occurred in its watershed, and silting after storms is not a problem. However, a proposed nickel mine along Baldface Creek threatens to pollute the river and damage its anadromous fish habitat as well as that of the main stem Smith River. In 2012, the Red Flat Nickel Corporation asked permission from the United States Forest Service to allow exploratory mining along the creek. Many local, state, and tribal agencies as well as environmental, fishing, and recreational organizations strongly oppose mining in the watershed.

Tributaries
Named tributaries of the North Fork Smith River from source to mouth are Horse, Chrome, and Hardrock creeks. Then comes Packsaddle Gulch, Baldface, Fall, and Cedar creeks, followed by Diamond, Still, and Stony creeks.

See also
 List of rivers of Oregon

References

External links
 KalmiopsisWild
 Smith River Alliance

Rivers of Curry County, Oregon
Klamath Mountains
Rivers of Del Norte County, California
Rivers of Northern California
Rivers of Oregon
Rogue River-Siskiyou National Forest
Six Rivers National Forest
Wild and Scenic Rivers of the United States